Bowed guitar is a method of playing a guitar, acoustic or electric, in which the guitarist uses a bow, rather than the more common plectrum, to vibrate the instruments' strings, similar to playing a viola da gamba. Unlike traditionally bowed instruments such as violins, the guitar generally has a relatively flat bridge radius and closely positioned strings, making it difficult to bow individual notes on the middle strings. The technique is often associated with Jimmy Page of Led Zeppelin and the Yardbirds, as well as Jónsi of Sigur Rós.  Eddie Phillips of the British group the Creation was one of the first rock guitarists to use a bow in their 1966 song "Making Time".

Bowed guitar players
 Eddie Phillips was one of the first 20th century guitarists to use a bow. His bowed guitar can be heard on The Creation's "Making Time".
 Jimmy Page, of Led Zeppelin and The Yardbirds, is perhaps one of the most famous bowed guitar players. His bowed guitar can be heard on the songs "Dazed and Confused" and "How Many More Times" from the album Led Zeppelin, and "In the Evening" from the album In Through the Out Door.
 Jónsi (Jón Þór Birgisson), the vocalist and guitarist for the Icelandic post-rock band Sigur Rós, uses a bowed guitar extensively. 
 Jonny Greenwood, lead guitarist of Radiohead, plays bowed guitar live on "Burn the Witch" and "Pyramid Song" to make sounds similar to whale cries (his brother Colin Greenwood used to make them on double bass).
 Jeff Martin of the Canadian rock band The Tea Party plays bowed guitar on some of his earlier songs such as "Save Me", from the album Splendor Solis.
 Sonic Youth's Lee Ranaldo plays bowed guitar on occasion, most notably in the intro to "Hey Joni". 
 The Besnard Lakes also make use of bowed guitar. Avant-garde composer Scott Fields often uses bows, including modified bows, in performance and on recordings, including "Mamet", "From the Diary of Dog Drexel", "We Were the Phliks", and "Beckett". 
 Claudio Sanchez from the American rock band Coheed and Cambria often uses a bow during live performances.
 Pink Floyd's Roger Waters used a bowed bass guitar on the songs "Lucifer Sam" and "The Scarecrow". 
 Lee Jackson of The Nice used a bowed bass guitar on the songs "Intermezzo from the Karelia Suite," "Hang on to a Dream," and "My Back Pages." 
 Tim McTague of Underoath uses a bow in the songs "Writing on the Walls," "To Whom It May Concern," and "Casting Such a Thin Shadow."
 English instrumentalist and composer Mike Oldfield played bowed guitar on his album Amarok.
 Andrew McKellar of the South African band Civil Twilight also uses a bow, on their songs "Perfect Stranger" and "Letters from the Sky" when performing live (source: video YouTube). 
 Skyler Skjelset of Fleet Foxes uses a bow on live performances of "Drops in the River" and "I Am All That I Need / Arroyo Seco / Thumbprint Scar". 
 Russell Senior of Pulp used a bow on live performances of "Little Girl (With Blue Eyes)". 
 Italian guitarist Sergio Altamura[it] frequently uses a bow and in some pieces applies a violin bridge to his guitar for that or uses a self-created electronic bow.
 Whitesnake's Adrian Vandenberg and Steve Vai used a bow in the song "Still of the Night" during live performance.
 Igor Haefeli, guitarist of Daughter, uses a bow on the songs "Love", "Still" and "Lifeforms".
 Paul Gregory of Lanterns on the Lake plays bowed guitar during live performances of "Ships in the Rain".
 Cliff Williams of AC/DC played a bowed bass with his previous band, Home, on the song "Lady of the Birds".
 Mike McCready of Pearl Jam played a bowed on the song "Pendulum" from the album Lightning Bolt
 Aidy James Stevens, guitarist of English post-punk bands You The Living and The Murder Act uses a cello bow extensively, on You The Living's "Reprobates" and "Precipice" and The Murder Act's "Red Cow" to name a few.
 Kristoffer Lo of Highasakite was seen using a bow on his guitar during a live performance of the song "Lover, where do you live?"
 Eddie Branch, working with Peter Murphy, used bowed electric bass on the track "Cuts You Up" as part of its signature refrain.
 Sameer Bhattacharya, guitarist of Flyleaf, used a bow on the songs "Sorrow" and on the intro of "Red Sam" during live performance.
 Marlon Harder of indie rock band Autopilot uses a bow regularly for his songs.
 Þorbjörn Steingrímsson of the Icelandic black/death metal act Zhrine uses a bow on multiple songs both in-studio and live.
 Rob Lyberg of the American rock band Eva Under Fire used a bow in the song "Drift".
 Kris Angylus (Kristopher Fairchild) of the drone doom band The Angelic Process used a bow on the guitar for much of the band's music.
 Low Roar in live sessions with the song "I'll keep coming"
 Masahiro Tobita of Japanese post-hardcore outfit Envy uses a bow on live performances of the song "Crystallize".
 Muhammad Naqi Abu Bakar of Sforzando!
 Jason Gormley of the Canadian indie post-rock Lifestory: Monologue.

See also
EBow
Arpeggione

References

External links

 Pickaso Guitar Bow 
 Information and discussion for bowed guitar players
Piranha Guitar Bow - For acoustic and electric guitar

Bowed string instruments
Guitar performance techniques
Guitars